Czech Championship women's basketball (Czech: Česká ženská basketbalová liga) - basketball tournament among Czech women's teams. The first draw took place in 1993, which became the champions of the Prague team USK Prague W. Most titles, currently 14, won the team from Brno, BK Žabiny Brno.

History
The Czech women's Basketball league joined the women's Euroleague in 2010. There are 40 elite teams in the Euroleague that compete for the Euroleague Championship. The Euroleague is directly affiliated with the International Basketball Federation (FIBA), which includes 51 European teams. As of 2013-2014, the women's Czech basketball league had 488 players total. The 12 teams in the Czech Women's Basketball League include: USK Prague W, Valosun Brno W, BK Žabiny Brno, Hradec Kralove W, VS Prague W, Slavia Prague W, Strakonice W, Trutnov W, Slovanka W, Karlovy Vary W, Karlin W, and SSMH Brno W.

Champions

List of champions

References

External links
Profile at eurobasket.com

Czech Republic
lea
Sports leagues established in 1993
Women
Professional sports leagues in the Czech Republic